Euseius querci is a species of mite in the family Phytoseiidae.

References

querci
Articles created by Qbugbot
Animals described in 1983